Abacetus subamaroides is a species of ground beetle in the subfamily Pterostichinae. It was described by Straneo in 1964.

References

subamaroides
Beetles described in 1964